The Bren gun was a series of light machine guns (LMG) made by Britain in the 1930s and used in various roles until 1992. While best known for its role as the British and Commonwealth forces' primary infantry LMG in World War II, it was also used in the Korean War and saw service throughout the latter half of the 20th century, including the 1982 Falklands War. Although fitted with a bipod, it could also be mounted on a tripod or be vehicle-mounted.

The Bren gun was a licensed version of the Czechoslovak ZGB 33 light machine gun which, in turn, was a modified version of the ZB vz. 26, which British Army officials had tested during a firearms service competition in the 1930s. The later Bren gun featured a distinctive top-mounted curved box magazine, conical flash hider, and quick change barrel. 

The name Bren was derived from Brno, the Czechoslovak city in Moravia, where the Zb vz. 26 was designed (in the Zbrojovka Brno Factory) and Enfield, site of the British Royal Small Arms Factory. The designer was Václav Holek, a gun inventor and design engineer.

In the 1950s, many Bren guns were re-barrelled to accept the 7.62×51mm NATO cartridge and modified to feed from the magazine for the L1 (Commonwealth version of the FN FAL) rifle as the L4 light machine gun. It was replaced in the British Army as the section LMG by the L7 general-purpose machine gun (GPMG), a heavier belt-fed weapon. This was supplemented in the 1980s by the L86 Light Support Weapon firing the 5.56×45mm NATO round, leaving the Bren gun in use only as a pintle mount on some vehicles. The Bren gun was manufactured by Indian Ordnance Factories as the "Gun Machine 7.62mm 1B" before it was discontinued in 2012.

Development

At the close of the First World War in 1918, the British Army was equipped with two main automatic weapons; the Vickers medium machine gun (MMG) and the Lewis light machine gun. The Vickers was heavy and required a supply of water to keep it in operation, which tended to relegate it to static defence and indirect fire support. The Lewis, although lighter, was still heavy and was prone to frequent stoppages; its barrel could not be changed in the field, which meant that sustained firing resulted in overheating until it stopped altogether. 

In 1922, to find a replacement for the Lewis, the Small Arms Committee of the British Army ran competitive trials between the Madsen machine gun, the M1918 Browning Automatic Rifle (BAR), the Hotchkiss M1909 machine gun, the Beardmore-Farquhar rifle, and the Lewis itself. Although the BAR was recommended, the sheer number of Lewis guns available and the difficult financial conditions meant that nothing was done. Various new models of light machine gun were tested as they became available, and in 1930, a further set of extensive trials commenced, overseen by Frederick Hubert Vinden. This time the weapons tested included the SIG Neuhausen KE7, the Vickers-Berthier and the Czechoslovak ZB vz. 27. The latter didn't meet high requirements for durability and reliability, mainly because gunpowder residue from British cordite was obstructing the gas tube (ZB vz. 27 was also sent in 7.92 Mauser instead of .303 British, but ZB already held a patent for a staggered magazine for rimmed rounds). The Vickers-Berthier was later adopted by the Indian Army because it could be manufactured at once, rather than wait for the British Lewis production run to finish; it too saw extensive service in World War II.

A modified variant with a shortened gas tube was tested again in June 1932, and then newly developed ZB-30 in .303 yet again tested in November. Receiving more feedback and incorporating it into the design by January 1933, yet two other modifications were tested by British representatives in Brno in July. One of the variants was selected, designated ZGB 33 (for Zbrojovka, Great Britain, 33), and 10 its samples were sent to England in autumn 1933. After additional trials in early 1934, more samples were ordered during the summer of 1934, and on May 24, 1935 the license for British manufacture was finally acquired, and the design was adopted under the Bren name.

The major changes were in the magazine and barrel and the lower pistol grip assembly which went from a swivelling grip frame pivoted on the front of the trigger guard to a sliding grip frame which included the forward tripod mount and sliding ejection port cover. The magazine was curved in order to feed the rimmed .303 inch SAA ("Small Arms Ammunition") cartridge, a change from the various rimless Mauser-design cartridges such as the 7.9-mm Mauser round previously used by Czech designs. These modifications were categorised in various numbered designations, ZB vz. 27, ZB vz. 30, ZB vz. 32, and finally the ZGB 33, which was licensed for manufacture under the Bren name.

The Bren was a gas-operated weapon using the same .303 ammunition as the standard British bolt-action rifle, the Lee–Enfield, firing at a rate between 480 and 540 rounds per minute (rpm), depending on the model. Propellant gases vented from a port towards the muzzle end of the barrel through a regulator (visible just in front of the bipod) with four quick-adjustment apertures of different sizes, intended to tailor the gas volume to different ambient temperatures (smallest flow at high temperature, e.g. summer desert, largest at low temperature, e.g. winter Arctic). The vented gas drove a piston which in turn actuated the breech block. Each gun came with a spare barrel that could be quickly changed when the barrel became hot during sustained fire, though later guns featured a chrome-lined barrel, which reduced the need for a spare. To change barrels, the release catch in front of the magazine was rotated to unlock the barrel. The carrying handle above the barrel was used to grip and remove the hot barrel without burning the hands.

The Bren was magazine-fed, which slowed its rate of fire and required more frequent reloading than British belt-fed machine guns such as the larger .303 Vickers machine gun. The slower rate of fire prevented more rapid overheating of the Bren's air-cooled barrel, and the Bren was much lighter than belt-fed machine guns, which typically had cooling jackets, often liquid filled. The magazines also prevented the ammunition from getting dirty, which was more of a problem with the Vickers with its 250-round canvas belts. The sights were offset to the left, to avoid the magazine on the top of the weapon. The position of the sights meant that the Bren could be fired only from the right shoulder.

Service

Second World War
In the British and Commonwealth armies, the Bren was generally issued on a scale of one per rifle section. An infantry battalion also had a "carrier" platoon, equipped with Universal Carriers, each of which carried a Bren gun. Parachute battalions from 1944 had an extra Bren in the Anti-tank platoon. The 66-man "Assault Troop" of British Commandos had a nominal establishment of four Bren guns. Realising the need for additional section-level firepower, the British Army endeavoured to issue the Bren in great numbers, with a stated goal of one Bren to every four private soldiers. The Bren was operated by a two-man crew, sometimes commanded by a Lance Corporal as an infantry section's "gun group", the remainder of the section forming the "rifle group". The gunner or "Number 1" carried and fired the Bren, and a loader or "Number 2" carried extra magazines, a spare barrel and a tool kit. Number 2 helped reload the gun and replace the barrel when it overheated, and spotted targets for Number 1.

Generally, the Bren was fired from the prone position using the attached bipod. On occasion, a Bren gunner would use his weapon on the move supported by a sling, much like an automatic rifle, and from standing or kneeling positions. Using the sling, Australian soldiers regularly fired the Bren from the hip, for instance in the marching fire tactic, a form of suppressive fire moving forward in assault. A Victoria Cross was awarded to Private Bruce Kingsbury for such use at Isurava, New Guinea, in 1942, during the Australians' fighting retreat from Kokoda.

Each British soldier's equipment normally included two magazines for his section's Bren gun. The large ammunition pouches on the 1937 Pattern Web Equipment were designed around the Bren magazine. The Bren was regarded as the principal weapon of an infantry section, providing the majority of its firepower. As such, all ranks were expected to be "experts in its use".

The Bren had an effective range of around  when fired from a prone position with a bipod. A 'rapid' fire rate of 120 rounds per minute (four magazines a minute) was sustainable with a barrel change after ten magazines (or reduction in fire rate) to limit wear but doctrine was to fire in 4-5 round bursts. Soldiers were instructed to fired single-shot in imitation of rifle fire to conceal the presence of an automatic weapon.

For a light machine gun of the interwar and early World War II era, the Bren was about average in weight. On long marches in non-operational areas it was often partially disassembled and its parts were carried by two soldiers. The top-mounted magazine vibrated and moved during fire, making the weapon more visible in combat, and many Bren gunners used paint or improvised canvas covers to disguise the prominent magazine.

The 30-round magazine was in practice usually filled with 27 or 28 rounds to prevent jams and for magazines kept full for a long time 20 rounds to avoid wearing out the magazine spring. Care needed to be taken when loading the magazine to ensure that each round went ahead of the previous round, so that the .303 cartridge rims did not overlap the wrong way, which would cause a jam. The spent cartridge cases were ejected downwards, which was an improvement on the Lewis gun, which ejected sideways, since the glint of them flying through the air could compromise a concealed firing position.

In general, the Bren was considered a reliable and effective light machine gun, though in North Africa it was reported to jam regularly unless kept very clean and free of sand or dirt. It was popular with British troops, who respected its reliability and combat effectiveness. The quality of the materials used would generally ensure minimal jamming. When the gun did jam through fouling caused by prolonged firing, the operator could adjust the four-position gas regulator to feed more gas to the piston increasing the power to operate the mechanism. The barrel needed to be unlocked and slid forward slightly to allow the regulator to be turned. It was even said that all problems with the Bren could simply be cleared by hitting the gun, turning the regulator or doing both. It was "by general consent the finest light machine gun in the world of its period, and the most useful weapon provided to the (French) "maquis" ... accurate up to 1,000 meters, and (it) could withstand immense maltreatment and unskilled use. "Resistants" were constantly pleading for maximum drops of Brens".

Although they were generally well-liked, the high cost of £40 each gun was an issue for the British Army leadership. This became a greater issue when it was discovered that only 2,300 of the 30,000 Bren guns issued to the British Expeditionary Force came back to Britain after the defeat of France. As the result, cost savings and increased rate of production became two main goals for subsequent variant designs. The Bren Mk II design simplified production by replacing the drum rear sight with a ladder design, making the bipod legs non-adjustable, simplifying the gun butt, reducing the use of stainless steel, among other steps that reduced the cost by 20% to 25%; Mk II was approved in September 1940 and entered production in 1941. While Enfield was able to produce only 400 Bren Mk I guns each month, with the various simplification efforts production numbers rose to 1,000 guns per week by 1943. Among the variant designs were two speciality prototypes that never entered production: The belt-fed Taden gun for stationary defence use, and the ultra-simplified Besal gun to be produced in case a German invasion of Britain actually took place (which would hinder British production efforts). Later designs of production Bren guns featured chrome-lined barrels that offered less resistance, preventing overheating and reducing the need for quick changes of barrels.

Bren guns were produced outside of Britain as well. In Canada, the John Inglis plant in Toronto began tooling its facilities for production in 1938; the first of 186,000 examples was completed in March 1940. Some of the Inglis-built Bren guns were chambered for the 7.92-mm Mauser ammunition; these were destined for export to Nationalist Chinese forces rather than for British and Commonwealth forces. In Australia, the Lithgow Small Arms Factory in New South Wales began building Bren guns in 1940; a total of 17,249 were built. In India, the factory at Ishapore began building Bren guns in 1942 (it had produced Vickers-Berthier machine guns prior to this time), and would continue producing them for decades long after the end of the Second World War. Many of the Bren guns produced at Ishapore went to Indian troops, who had lost a great number of automatic weapons during the disastrous campaigns against the Japanese in Malaya and Burma; 17th Indian Infantry Division, for example, found itself with only 56 Bren guns after fleeing out of Burma in 1942.

A tripod mount with 42 degrees of traverse was available to allow the Bren to be used on "fixed lines" of fire for defensive shooting at pre-determined areas in the dark or if obscured by fog or smoke. The Bren was also used on many vehicles, the Universal Carrier also known as the "Bren Gun Carrier", and on tanks and armoured cars. The Carrier was intended to use its "armour, speed and cross country performance" to bring the gun team into position from where it would fire dismounted; firing from the vehicle only in an emergency.  
The Bren could not be used as a co-axial weapon on tanks, as the magazine restricted its depression and was awkward to handle in confined spaces, and it was therefore used on a pintle mount only. (The belt fed Vickers or Besa, the latter being another Czechoslovak machine gun design adopted by the British, were instead used as co-axial weapons.) An unfortunate problem occurred when the Bren was fired from the Dingo Scout Car; the hot cartridge cases tended to be ejected down the neck of the driver, whose position was next to the pintle. A canvas bag was designed to catch the cartridges and overcome the problem, but it seems to have been rarely issued.

The Bren was also employed in the anti-aircraft role with the tripod reconfigured for high angle fire. There were also several designs of less-portable mountings, including the Gallows and Mottley mounts. A 100-round pan magazine was available for the Bren for use in the anti-aircraft role.

The Bren's direct ancestor, the Czechoslovak ZB vz. 26, was also used in World War II by German and Romanian forces, including units of the Waffen SS. Many 7.92 mm ZB light machine guns were shipped to China, where they were employed first against the Japanese in World War II, and later against UN forces in Korea, including British and Commonwealth units. Some ex-Chinese Czech ZB weapons were also in use in the early stages of the Vietnam War. Production of a 7.92 mm round model for the Far East was carried out by Inglis of Canada. The Bren was also delivered to the Soviet Union as part of the lend-lease program.

Post-war
The British Army, and the armies of various countries of the Commonwealth, used the Bren in the Korean War, the Malayan Emergency, the Mau Mau Uprising and the Indonesia–Malaysia confrontation, where it was preferred to its replacement, the belt-fed L7 GPMG, on account of its lighter weight. In the conflict in Northern Ireland (1969–1998), a British Army squad typically carried the L4A4 version of the Bren as the squad automatic weapon in the 1970s. During the Falklands War in 1982, 40 Commando Royal Marines carried one LMG and one GPMG per section. Its final operational deployment with the British Army, on a limited scale, was in the First Gulf War in 1991.

When the British Army adopted the 7.62 mm NATO cartridge, the Bren was re-designed to 7.62 mm calibre, fitted with a new bolt, barrel and magazine. It was re-designated as the "L4 light machine gun" (in various sub-versions) and remained in British Army service into the 1990s. A slotted flash hider similar to that of the contemporary L1 rifle and L7 general purpose machine gun replaced the conical flash hider. The change from a rimmed to rimless cartridge and nearly straight magazine improved feeding considerably, and allowed use of 20-round magazines from the 7.62 mm L1A1 Self-Loading Rifle. Bren gunners using the L4A1 were normally issued with the 30-round magazine from the SAW L2A1.

Completion of the move to a 5.56 mm NATO cartridge led to the Army removing the Bren/L4 from the list of approved weapons and then withdrawing it from service.

The Mark III Bren remained in limited use with the Army Reserve of the Irish Defence Forces until 2006, when the 7.62 mm GPMG replaced it. The Bren was popular with the soldiers who fired it (known as Brenners) as it was light and durable, and had a reputation for accuracy. The most notable use of the Bren by Irish forces was in the Congo Crisis during the 1960s, when the Bren was the regular army's standard section automatic weapon.

Bren guns were in service with the Rhodesian Security Forces during the Rhodesian Bush War, including a substantial number re-chambered for 7.62 mm cartridges similar to those examples in the British Army. The Rhodesian Bren guns continued to see frequent action until the 1970s, when they were largely replaced by the FN MAG. A few were captured and re-issued by the Zimbabwe People's Revolutionary Army (ZIPRA). Some examples were still in service with reservists of the British South Africa Police in 1980, and were inherited by the Zimbabwe Republic Police upon the country's internationally recognised independence. Zimbabwean policemen continued to deploy Bren guns during operations against ZIPRA dissidents throughout the early 1980s.

The South African Defence Force deployed Bren guns during the South African Border War alongside the more contemporary FN MAG as late as 1978.

Variants

Mark 1
Introduced September 1937; the original Czechoslovak designed ZGB 33. Overall length ,  barrel length. Weight .

Features:
 Drum-pattern rear aperture sight
 Buttstrap for use over-the-shoulder when firing
 Rear grip under butt
 Telescoping bipod
 Folding cocking handle

An Enfield-made .303 Bren Mk 1 was converted to 7.92mm in 1938 due to the suggestion of a possibility of a British Army change over to a rimless cartridge for machine guns being mooted.

Mark 2
Introduced 1941. A simplified version of the Mk1 more suited to wartime production with original design features subsequently found to be unnecessary deleted.  Produced by Inglis of Canada and the Monotype Group through a number of component manufacturing factories. Sometimes known as the "Garage hands" model. Overall length ,  barrel length. Weight .

Features:
 Folding-leaf rear sight
 Buttstrap deleted
 Rear grip deleted
 Fixed height bipod
 Fixed cocking handle

The Bren Mk2 was much simplified in the body, which although still being milled from a solid billet of steel, required significantly fewer milling operations than the Mk1, resulting in a much cleaner appearance. The bipod was simplified in design as well as not having extending legs. Most Mk2 bipods resembled a simple A-frame and were more 'soldier proof'. The Mk2 also featured a slightly higher rate of fire than the Mk1.

The woodwork on the Mk2 was simplified by being less ornate and ergonomic, which sped up the manufacturing process. The barrel was also simplified by means of a non-stepped removable flash hider and, in some cases, a barrel fore-end that was matte instead of highly polished. The buffered buttplate of the Mk1 was omitted and replaced with a sheet metal buttplate.

A small number of Inglis-made .303 Bren Mk 2 were converted post-war to fire the .280 in (7 mm) Mk 1Z round used by the EM-2 rifle.

The Inglis version of the Bren Mk 2 chambered for the .30-06 (7.62 mm) cartridge and known as the M41 was also manufactured in Taiwan after the end of the Chinese Civil War.

Mark 3
A shorter and lighter Bren made by Enfield from 1944 for the war in the East and for Airborne Forces. This was similar to the Mk2 but with the light weight features of the early Mk1. With the main distinguishing feature being a shorter barrel and serrated area in front of the barrel nut.  Overall length ,  barrel length. Weight .

Mark 4
As with the Mk3 but this was a conversion of a Mk2. Overall length ,  barrel length. Weight .

L4

The Bren was converted to 7.62×51mm NATO in the 1950s, and designated the L4. L4 Brens can easily be identified by their straighter magazine and cylindrical flash hider. The British-issue L4 magazine retains the 30-round capacity and has a slight curve. The L4 magazine was interchangeable with the L1A1 SLR magazine, so the L4 Bren can be seen fitted with straight 20-round magazines from the SLR or with the straight 30-round magazine from the Australian L2A1 or Canadian C2A1 heavy-barrel SLR. The flash suppressor was changed from the cone type of .303 variants to a slotted, cylindrical type similar in appearance to that used on the SLR and L7 GPMG. The L4 remained in British service until the 1990s.

Taden gun

The Taden gun was a development of the Bren to use with the .280 British (7 mm) intermediate round proposed to replace the .303 in British service. The Taden was belt-fed with spade grips and would have replaced both the Bren and the Vickers machine gun. Although reliable it was not accepted due to the US-driven standardization within NATO on the larger 7.62×51mm NATO round.

Semiautomatic Bren guns
Many nations' militaries have disposed of their Bren guns as surplus to their needs. Surplus Brens have been imported to the United States for sale to collectors, but due to US gun laws restricting the importation of automatic weapons such guns must be legally destroyed by cutting up the receivers. A number of US gunsmiths have manufactured new semiautomatic Brens by welding the pieces of destroyed receivers back together, with modifications to prevent the use of full automatic parts, and fitting new fire-control components capable of only semiautomatic fire. The balance of the parts are surplus Bren parts. Such "semiautomatic machine guns" are legally considered rifles under US Federal law and the laws of most states.

Production

United Kingdom
Bren guns were produced at the Royal Small Arms Factory, in Enfield, London. The first Bren guns were built in September 1937, and by December, a total of 42 had been produced. Weekly production was 300 Brens a week in July 1938, and 400 a week in September 1939. 
The Monotype Group produced Mark 2 Brens. Enfield produced a total of 220,000 Mark I Bren guns, 57,600 in Mark III, and 250 in Mark IV.

Canada
John Inglis and Company received a contract from the British and Canadian governments in March 1938 to supply 5,000 Bren machine guns to the UK and 7,000 Bren machine guns to Canada. Both countries shared the capital costs of bringing in this new production facility. Production started in 1940; by August 1942, the Inglis plant was averaging 10,000 Brens per month, and produced 186,000 Bren guns of all variants by the end of the war, including 43,000 chambered in 7.92×57mm Mauser for export to the Chinese National Revolutionary Army.

India

In 1942, the Ishapore Arsenal began to produce Bren guns, and continued to do so long after the end of World War II, also manufacturing variants in 7.62×51mm NATO.
A shadow factory for Ishapore was set up at Kanpur and produced .303 Brens before it was later rechambered to fire 7.62 NATO ammo in 1964 as the 1A LMG.

Australia
In 1940, the Lithgow Small Arms Factory in New South Wales began to manufacture Bren guns, producing a total of 17,249 by 1945.

Users

 : National Liberation Army received 500 Brens from Egypt
 : during World War II and Korean War. Indonesia–Malaysia confrontation (as L4A4). Continued in limited service until about the time of the general introduction of the F88 Steyr (ca 1990).
 
 
 
 : post-war
 
 
 : received Czech-made Brens in 8×56mmR, designated kartěnice 39
 
  Chadian FROLINAT
 : used by Gendarmerie and Republican Guard
 : Mark 2 version known to be used in the Croatian War of Independence.
 : Many guns captured from Kuomintang. Used during Korean War. Some converted to fire 7.62x39 caliber ammunition from ammo supplied by their Soviet allies. They used regular AK-47 magazines.
 : used by National Revolutionary Army 43,000 guns produced in 7.92×57mm Mauser by Inglis in Canada. Later in 1952, Taiwan produced a .30-06 Springfield version of Bren Mk II, the Type 41.
 
 
 
 : post-war
 
 
 : Used by the Free French Forces and French Resistance.
 : Captured Brens were issued to the Milice.
 French Far East Expeditionary Corps
 
 
 
 : People's Revolutionary Armed Forces
 
 : Used by the Royal Hong Kong Regiment.
 : manufactured by the Ordnance Factories Board Phased out of Indian military service in 2012.
 : 
  Iraq
 : Irish Defence Forces, replaced by the FN MAG in 1960s. Remained in use with Irish military reserve forces until the early 2000s.
 : During the 1948 Arab–Israeli War and for some time thereafter by the Haganah and the Israeli Defense Forces. Replaced after Operation Kadesh (1956).
 : airdropped to partisans and also issued to the Italian Co-Belligerent Army in the latter part of WWII. It continued to see post-war use with the Italian Army. Also used by the Italian Police in .30-06 caliber.
 
 : captured weapons.
 : Arab Legion
 
 
 
 
 
 
 
 : used captured examples under the designation 7.7 mm Leichtes MG 138(e)
 : Bren L4
 : post-war
 : WWII and L4 post war
 
 : post-war
 
 
 : Used by the Polish Underground State and Polish Armed Forces in the West during World War II.
 : m/43
 
 
 
 
 : Used by Ceylon Defence Force in World War II
 
  (now Eswatini)
 : 294 guns were purchased by the Tibetan Army in 1950.
 
 
 
 : British and Commonwealth forces, and cadet forces until the introduction of the L98 Cadet Rifle
 State of Vietnam
: used by Viet-Minh acquired from China and the Soviet Union or by capture
 : Supplied by the United Kingdom during the Lend-Lease program.
 : Yugoslav Partisans and Chetniks during World War II;
 :

Gallery

See also
CZ 805 BREN
 Charlton Automatic Rifle
 Degtyaryov machine gun
 FM 24/29 light machine gun
 Mendoza RM2
 Type 73 light machine gun
 Type 96 light machine gun
 Type 99 light machine gun
 Vickers K machine gun

Notes

References

External links

 Modern Firearms (additional information)

History of the London Borough of Enfield
Light machine guns
Machine guns of the United Kingdom
World War II infantry weapons of the United Kingdom
World War II machine guns
.303 British machine guns
Czechoslovakia–United Kingdom relations
Military equipment introduced in the 1930s